Echis ocellatus, known by the common names West African carpet viper and ocellated carpet viper, is a highly venomous species of viper endemic to West Africa. No subspecies are currently recognized.

It is responsible for more human fatalities due to snakebite than all other African species combined. An antivenom called Echitab-plus-ICP is manufactured by the Costa Rican Instituto Clodomiro Picado and another called EchiTabG is manufactured by MicroPharm Ltd in the UK.

Taxonomy
Othmar Stemmler described the species in 1970. It was considered a subspecies of the E. carinatus.

Recent revisions split the species into three, with the recognition of Echis jogeri from Senegal, Guinea and Mali, and Echis romani from eastern Nigeria, southeastern Niger, Cameroon and Chad.  

The specific name, ocellatus, is a reference to the distinctive series of "eye-spots" (ocelli) which runs the length of the body.

Common names include African saw-tailed viper, ocellated carpet viper and West African carpet viper.

Description and behavior
They are characterized by their bulging eyes and short snout, typical of species of the genus Echis. E. ocellatus is terrestrial, nocturnal and crespuscular, it usually goes out to hunt its preys at the first hours of the night, preys like small vertebrates, like mammals, birds, lizards and amphibians, it has already been reported hunting small invertebrates like centipedes and scorpions. It's a very aggressive viper, it forms its body lika a ''S'' and rubs itself making an alert sound with its scales.

Range and habitat 
It is found in West Africa in Mali, Ivory Coast, Burkina Faso, Ghana, Togo, Benin, southern Niger, and Nigeria. Older records from Senegal and Guinea refer to Echis jogeri, and those from eastern Nigeria, Cameroon and southern Chad to Echis romani.

The type locality is described as "Haute Volta, Garango, 048 N, 033 W" (Burkina Faso).

There are also reports of single specimens found in the Bangui in the Central African Republic, and in central Sudan. It is rarely found north of the 15th parallel, after which E. leucogaster becomes more common. The geographic range of E. ocellatus extends to the coast via the Dahomey Gap. They are mainly found in savanna and occasionally in wooded areas.

Reproduction
Sexually mature females lay between 6 and 20 eggs, usually at the end of the dry season in February to March.

Venom 
It's responsible by more fatalities than all other african snakes combined, its venom is compound of Procoagulants, anticoagulants, hemorraghins, nephrotoxins and necrotoxins, symptoms of their bites include local pain, swelling, bleeding necrosis and disfigurement which may result in amputation. Systemic symptoms include coagulopathy, hemorraghes, shock, renal failure and blindness. The envenoming rate is 80% and the lethality rate is 10-20%.

References

Further reading
 Cherlin VA. 1990. [A taxonomic revision of the snake genus Echis (Viperidae). II. An analysis of taxonomy and description of new forms]. [Proc. Zool. Inst. Leningrad] 207: 193-223. (in Russian).
 Hughes B. 1976. Notes on African Carpet Vipers, Echis carinatus, E. leucogaster and E. ocellatus (Viperidae, Serpentes). Revue Suisse de Zoologie 83 (2): 359-371.
 Stemmler O. 1970. Die Sandrasselotter aus Westafrika: Echis carinatus ocellatus subsp. nov. (Serpentes, Viperidae). Revue Suisse de Zoologie 77 (2): 273-282.

External links
 
 

Viperinae
Reptiles described in 1970